Bukola is a Nigerian unisex given name of Yoruba origin which means "added wealth." It is a diminutive version of names such as "Oluwabukola" meaning "God has added to Wealth" and "Adebukola" meaning "The Crown has added to Wealth".

Notable people with the name include:

 Bukola Abogunloko (born 1994), Nigerian sprinter 
 Bukola Wright (born 1967)  Nigerian actress-politician
 Bukola Elemide (born 1982), Nigerian French singer-songwriter
 Bukola Oriola (born 1976), Nigerian American journalist
 Bukola Saraki (born 1962), Nigerian politician

References

Yoruba given names
Nigerian names
Unisex given names